Bobovo pri Ponikvi  is a settlement in the Municipality of Šentjur, in eastern Slovenia. The railway line from Ljubljana to Maribor runs along the northern edge of the settlement's territory. The settlement, and the entire municipality, are included in the Savinja Statistical Region, which is in the Slovenian portion of the historical Duchy of Styria.

Name
The name of the settlement was changed from Bobovo to Bobovo pri Ponikvi in 1953.

References

External links
Bobovo pri Ponikvi at Geopedia

Populated places in the Municipality of Šentjur